Pedro Velázquez (born 13 May 1983) is a Paraguayan former professional footballer who played as a forward. He participated in 2003 South American Youth Championship with the Paraguay U20 national team.

Career 
In January 2015, he signed with Persela Lamongan.

Honours 
Club LibertadÄ
 Segunda División: 2000
 Primera División: 2002

References

External links 
 
 

1983 births
Living people
People from Paraguarí
Paraguayan footballers
Association football forwards
Liga 1 (Indonesia) players
Sportivo Luqueño players
Deportes Iquique footballers
OFK Petrovac players
Puerto Montt footballers
Universitario de Sucre footballers
Paraguayan expatriate footballers
Paraguayan expatriate sportspeople in Chile
Expatriate footballers in Chile
Paraguayan expatriate sportspeople in Bolivia
Expatriate footballers in Bolivia
Paraguayan expatriate sportspeople in Colombia
Expatriate footballers in Colombia
Paraguayan expatriate sportspeople in Indonesia
Expatriate footballers in Indonesia
Expatriate footballers in Montenegro